The Rostov Constituency (No.195) is a Russian legislative constituency in Yaroslavl Oblast. Until 2007 the constituency covered most of Yaroslavl Oblast outside the city of Yaroslavl. Since 2016 the constituency was gerrymandered to include half of Yaroslavl and southern and western Yaroslavl Oblast.

Members elected

Election results

1993

|-
! colspan=2 style="background-color:#E9E9E9;text-align:left;vertical-align:top;" |Candidate
! style="background-color:#E9E9E9;text-align:left;vertical-align:top;" |Party
! style="background-color:#E9E9E9;text-align:right;" |Votes
! style="background-color:#E9E9E9;text-align:right;" |%
|-
|style="background-color:"|
|align=left|Anatoly Greshnevikov
|align=left|Independent
|
|21.34%
|-
| colspan="5" style="background-color:#E9E9E9;"|
|- style="font-weight:bold"
| colspan="3" style="text-align:left;" | Total
| 
| 100%
|-
| colspan="5" style="background-color:#E9E9E9;"|
|- style="font-weight:bold"
| colspan="4" |Source:
|
|}

1995

|-
! colspan=2 style="background-color:#E9E9E9;text-align:left;vertical-align:top;" |Candidate
! style="background-color:#E9E9E9;text-align:left;vertical-align:top;" |Party
! style="background-color:#E9E9E9;text-align:right;" |Votes
! style="background-color:#E9E9E9;text-align:right;" |%
|-
|style="background-color:"|
|align=left|Anatoly Greshnevikov (incumbent)
|align=left|Power to the People!
|
|31.45%
|-
|style="background-color:"|
|align=left|Galina Stepenko
|align=left|Independent
|
|14.58%
|-
|style="background-color:#959698"|
|align=left|Dmitry Andrienko
|align=left|Derzhava
|
|13.89%
|-
|style="background-color:"|
|align=left|Georgy Sadchikov
|align=left|Yabloko
|
|10.93%
|-
|style="background-color:"|
|align=left|Aleksey Zvyagin
|align=left|Liberal Democratic Party
|
|6.68%
|-
|style="background-color:#FF8201"|
|align=left|Aleksandr Lazarev
|align=left|Christian-Democratic Union - Christians of Russia
|
|5.17%
|-
|style="background-color:#000000"|
|colspan=2 |against all
|
|14.69%
|-
| colspan="5" style="background-color:#E9E9E9;"|
|- style="font-weight:bold"
| colspan="3" style="text-align:left;" | Total
| 
| 100%
|-
| colspan="5" style="background-color:#E9E9E9;"|
|- style="font-weight:bold"
| colspan="4" |Source:
|
|}

1999

|-
! colspan=2 style="background-color:#E9E9E9;text-align:left;vertical-align:top;" |Candidate
! style="background-color:#E9E9E9;text-align:left;vertical-align:top;" |Party
! style="background-color:#E9E9E9;text-align:right;" |Votes
! style="background-color:#E9E9E9;text-align:right;" |%
|-
|style="background-color:"|
|align=left|Anatoly Greshnevikov (incumbent)
|align=left|Russian All-People's Union
|
|34.38%
|-
|style="background-color:"|
|align=left|Tatyana Moskalkova
|align=left|Yabloko
|
|19.47%
|-
|style="background-color:#3B9EDF"|
|align=left|Oleg Rassadkin
|align=left|Fatherland – All Russia
|
|14.60%
|-
|style="background-color:"|
|align=left|Anatoly Voropaev
|align=left|Independent
|
|6.96%
|-
|style="background-color:#23238E"|
|align=left|Irina Dorofeeva
|align=left|Our Home – Russia
|
|5.45%
|-
|style="background-color:#FF4400"|
|align=left|Yury Korechkov
|align=left|Andrey Nikolayev and Svyatoslav Fyodorov Bloc
|
|3.63%
|-
|style="background-color:"|
|align=left|Lidia Kurlova
|align=left|Liberal Democratic Party
|
|2.24%
|-
|style="background-color:"|
|align=left|Ivan Klimenko
|align=left|Independent
|
|1.82%
|-
|style="background-color:#000000"|
|colspan=2 |against all
|
|9.41%
|-
| colspan="5" style="background-color:#E9E9E9;"|
|- style="font-weight:bold"
| colspan="3" style="text-align:left;" | Total
| 
| 100%
|-
| colspan="5" style="background-color:#E9E9E9;"|
|- style="font-weight:bold"
| colspan="4" |Source:
|
|}

2003

|-
! colspan=2 style="background-color:#E9E9E9;text-align:left;vertical-align:top;" |Candidate
! style="background-color:#E9E9E9;text-align:left;vertical-align:top;" |Party
! style="background-color:#E9E9E9;text-align:right;" |Votes
! style="background-color:#E9E9E9;text-align:right;" |%
|-
|style="background-color:"|
|align=left|Anatoly Greshnevikov (incumbent)
|align=left|Rodina
|
|64.61%
|-
|style="background-color:"|
|align=left|Dmitry Yevseev
|align=left|Independent
|
|5.44%
|-
|style="background-color:"|
|align=left|Dmitry Starodubtsev
|align=left|Agrarian Party
|
|5.24%
|-
|style="background-color:#00A1FF"|
|align=left|Dmitry Shatsky
|align=left|Party of Russia's Rebirth-Russian Party of Life
|
|3.73%
|-
|style="background-color:"|
|align=left|Ruslan Popovich
|align=left|United Russia
|
|2.79%
|-
|style="background-color:"|
|align=left|Natalya Lazareva
|align=left|Independent
|
|1.97%
|-
|style="background-color:"|
|align=left|Vladimir Poryvkin
|align=left|Liberal Democratic Party
|
|1.29%
|-
|style="background-color:"|
|align=left|Olga Kutuzova
|align=left|Independent
|
|1.25%
|-
|style="background-color:#164C8C"|
|align=left|Aleksandr Bogdanov
|align=left|United Russian Party Rus'
|
|0.90%
|-
|style="background-color:#14589F"|
|align=left|Viktor Myanko
|align=left|Development of Enterprise
|
|0.65%
|-
|style="background-color:#000000"|
|colspan=2 |against all
|
|10.24%
|-
| colspan="5" style="background-color:#E9E9E9;"|
|- style="font-weight:bold"
| colspan="3" style="text-align:left;" | Total
| 
| 100%
|-
| colspan="5" style="background-color:#E9E9E9;"|
|- style="font-weight:bold"
| colspan="4" |Source:
|
|}

2016

|-
! colspan=2 style="background-color:#E9E9E9;text-align:left;vertical-align:top;" |Candidate
! style="background-color:#E9E9E9;text-align:leftt;vertical-align:top;" |Party
! style="background-color:#E9E9E9;text-align:right;" |Votes
! style="background-color:#E9E9E9;text-align:right;" |%
|-
|style="background:"| 
|align=left|Anatoly Greshnevikov
|align=left|A Just Russia
|
|41.88%
|-
|style="background-color:"|
|align=left|Vladimir Denisov
|align=left|Rodina
|
|11.99%
|-
|style="background-color:"|
|align=left|Mikhail Paramonov
|align=left|Communist Party
|
|11.99%
|-
|style="background-color:"|
|align=left|Ilya Chikhalov
|align=left|Liberal Democratic Party
|
|10.30%
|-
|style="background-color:"|
|align=left|Konstantin Kurchenkov
|align=left|The Greens
|
|6.65%
|-
|style="background:"| 
|align=left|Boris Loginov
|align=left|Yabloko
|
|3.86%
|-
|style="background-color:"|
|align=left|Yevgeny Tarlo
|align=left|Party of Growth
|
|3.15%
|-
|style="background:"| 
|align=left|Stanislav Smirnov
|align=left|Communists of Russia
|
|3.12%
|-
|style="background-color:"|
|align=left|Aleksey Povasin
|align=left|Patriots of Russia
|
|2.32%
|-
| colspan="5" style="background-color:#E9E9E9;"|
|- style="font-weight:bold"
| colspan="3" style="text-align:left;" | Total
| 
| 100%
|-
| colspan="5" style="background-color:#E9E9E9;"|
|- style="font-weight:bold"
| colspan="4" |Source:
|
|}

2021

|-
! colspan=2 style="background-color:#E9E9E9;text-align:left;vertical-align:top;" |Candidate
! style="background-color:#E9E9E9;text-align:left;vertical-align:top;" |Party
! style="background-color:#E9E9E9;text-align:right;" |Votes
! style="background-color:#E9E9E9;text-align:right;" |%
|-
|style="background-color: " |
|align=left|Anatoly Greshnevikov (incumbent)
|align=left|A Just Russia — For Truth
|
|34.27%
|-
|style="background-color: " |
|align=left|Larisa Ushakova
|align=left|United Russia
|
|29.31%
|-
|style="background-color:"|
|align=left|Oleg Leontyev
|align=left|Communist Party
|
|10.43%
|-
|style="background-color: " |
|align=left|Artyom Denisov
|align=left|Communists of Russia
|
|5.95%
|-
|style="background-color: "|
|align=left|Vladimir Karpov
|align=left|New People
|
|4.97%
|-
|style="background-color:"|
|align=left|Yevgeny Smirnov
|align=left|Liberal Democratic Party
|
|3.48%
|-
|style="background-color: "|
|align=left|Aleksandr Dolgushin
|align=left|Party of Pensioners
|
|3.31%
|-
|style="background-color:"|
|align=left|Vladimir Gusev
|align=left|The Greens
|
|1.83%
|-
|style="background-color:"|
|align=left|Aleksey Kudryashov
|align=left|Russian Party of Freedom and Justice
|
|1.46%
|-
|style="background-color: " |
|align=left|Vasily Tsependa
|align=left|Yabloko
|
|1.43%
|-
|style="background-color:"|
|align=left|Aleksandr Dobychin
|align=left|Rodina
|
|0.90%
|-
| colspan="5" style="background-color:#E9E9E9;"|
|- style="font-weight:bold"
| colspan="3" style="text-align:left;" | Total
| 
| 100%
|-
| colspan="5" style="background-color:#E9E9E9;"|
|- style="font-weight:bold"
| colspan="4" |Source:
|
|}

See also 
 Yaroslavl constituency

Notes

References

Russian legislative constituencies
Politics of Yaroslavl Oblast